Al Kresta (born 1951) is a Catholic broadcaster, journalist and author. A former Evangelical pastor, he is now the President and CEO of Ave Maria Radio, and host of Kresta in the Afternoon, produced by Ave Maria Radio and syndicated on EWTN Global Catholic Radio, heard on more than 350 stations around the United States, Sirius Satellite Radio, and numerous webstreams.

Personal background 

A 1976 honors graduate of Michigan State University, Kresta has done graduate work in theology at Sacred Heart Major Seminary in Detroit and Ashland Theological Seminary. 

In 1986, Kresta began pastoring Shalom Ministry in Taylor, MI. He became well known in the Detroit area for his program, “Talk from the Heart,” one of the top-rated Christian talk shows during the 1980s and 90s on WMUZ. When he began the program, Al was a Protestant pastor. The questions forced upon him as pastor, however, led him to return to the Catholic Church of his upbringing. His profound personal conversion to Christ and reversion to the Catholic Church is told in the best-selling anthology "Surprised By Truth".

In 1997 Domino’s Pizza founder Tom Monaghan recruited him to launch the media apostolate, Ave Maria Communications. Over the years, Kresta has engaged in vigorous discussions and debates with many nationally known figures from politics, the arts, the Church, academia, and business.

Kresta has been a guest on BBC Radio and major TV network news affiliates. His radio work has received mention by Associated Press, “The Washington Times,” “National Catholic Reporter,” “Our Sunday Visitor,” “Envoy,” “Christianity Today,” and numerous metropolitan newspapers.

Kresta's life and spiritual journey took on a new dimension in February 2003, when he lost his left leg to necrotizing fasciitis, an infection often referred to as the "flesh-eating bacteria." His extended recovery and eventual return to broadcasting have given him new insights into the realities of suffering and hope. 

Kresta and his wife, Sally, were married in 1977 and have five children.

Books

Kresta is the author of four books:
 Why Do Catholics Genuflect?:   And Answers to Other Puzzling Questions About the Catholic Church, St. Anthony Messenger Press, 2001.  ; 
 Why Are Catholics So Concerned About Sin?:  More Answers to Puzzling Questions About the Catholic Church, Servant Books, 2005.   , 
 Moments of Grace:  Inspiring Stories from Well-Known Catholics (with Nick Thomm), Servant Books, 2008 ; 
 Dangers to the Faith:  Recognizing Catholicism’s 21st Century Opponents, Our Sunday Visitor, 2013  ; 

Kresta is also a contributor to 
 Shaken By Scandal:  Catholics Speak Out About Priests’ Sexual Abuse  by Paul Thigpen, Charis Books, 2002.   

and Loving Your Neighbor (Capital Research Center).

Why Do Catholics Genuflect? 

Why Do Catholic Genuflect? has made the top-10 list of Catholic books compiled by the Catholic Book Publisher’s Association.  It answers more than 50 common questions about Catholic religious beliefs and spiritual practices. At its release, Kresta explained that the book isn’t intended to be “a definitive work of apologetics.”  Rather, it is written in question-and-answer style like “a conversation that would help interested Catholics and non-Catholics better understand why Catholics believe and behave as we do.”

References

External links
Al Kresta's Ave Maria Radio page

 

1951 births
Living people
Converts to Roman Catholicism from Evangelicalism
American Roman Catholics
Michigan State University alumni
Sacred Heart Major Seminary alumni
Ashland Theological Seminary alumni
People from Michigan